Avenida Roque Sáenz Peña, better known as Diagonal Norte (Spanish for "North Diagonal", the counterpart to Diagonal Sur), is an important avenue in the San Nicolás neighborhood of Buenos Aires, Argentina. It is oriented south-east/north-west, diagonally bisecting the city blocks (manzanas) which give the city centre a checkerboard plan. It is named after President Roque Sáenz Peña, who held power from 1910 to 1914 and passed the law which established universal suffrage, secret ballot and an electoral register.

Connections
The north-west corner of Plaza de Mayo is the start of Avenida Presidente Roque Sáenz Peña (i.e. the corner of Avenida Rivadavia and San Martín street), just to the north of the city hall. It runs directly to the northwest and diagonally crosses the following streets: Bartolomé Mitre, Juan Domingo Perón and Sarmiento, and calle Florida, Maipú, Esmeralda, Suipacha and the Carabelas passage, before arriving at Plaza de la República, location of the Obelisk of Buenos Aires, where Avenida 9 de julio meets Avenida Corrientes. Still in a straight diagonal line, it crosses this intersection and continues to the next crossroads, the junction of Lavalle and Libertad in Plaza Lavalle, opposite the Courts of Justice.

Underground
Below the entire length of the avenue runs  line  of the Buenos Aires Underground, which has two stations along the Diagonal (stations  Catedral and 9 de julio) and a third station (Tribunales) near its western end.   Line  of the Buenos Aires Underground  also has one station: Diagonal Norte.

Points of interest

Avenida Roque Sáenz Peña (Diagonal Norte)

External links
 

Roque